Righty may refer to:
Right-hander or righty, someone who is right-handed

Arts, entertainment, and media

Fictional characters
Migi or Righty, a character on Parasyte, a manga series
Righty, a character in Monsuno, a Japanese-American animated series

Mascots
Righty, a mascot for the Boston Red Sox Major League Baseball team

Other uses
Lefty Loosey, Righty Tighty, a mnemonic used for the directions to loosen or tighten screws
Rightist or righty, someone who believes in right-wing politics

See also
Lefty (disambiguation)